Anastasia Myskina was the defending champion, but lost in round two.

Maria Sharapova won the title, defeating Alicia Molik in the final.

Main draw

Seeds
The top four seeds received a bye into the second round.

Finals

Top half

Bottom half

References

External links
 wtatour.com website
 iftennis.com website

Qatar Ladies Open
Qatar Ladies Open
2005 in Qatari sport